Harlip was a photographic studio specialising in celebrity portraits, based at 161 New Bond Street, Mayfair, London, England and run by Dr Gregory Harlip, and later his widow Madame Monte Harlip, both of Eastern European origin. Up until 1937, the "Atelier Harlip", as it was called in German, had been based at Kurfürstendamm, Berlin. In 1937, the Harlips left Berlin because of growing Nazi repressions against Jewish companies.

After Dr Harlip's death on 7 April 1945, Madame Harlip continued the business as one of the great society photographers of the 1950s. Known for catchphrases to the sitter such as "Give me Rembrandt", her ingredients for a good portrait were "life, honesty of expression, simplicity". She lived at Stanmore, Middlesex, and died in 1982.

References
The Times, Saturday, May 23, 1981; pg. 23
Display advert, The Times, Friday, September 8, 1939; pg. 11
Deaths, The Times, Friday, April 20, 1945; pg. 1
"£5000 theft from home of actress", The Times, Monday, October 12, 1953; pg. 4
Television: Snowdon on Camera, The Times, Monday, May 25, 1981; pg. 7;
Harlip National Portrait Gallery
National Portrait Gallery Photographers
Madame Harlip The Philip Townsend Archive

Photographers from London
Photographers from Berlin
Jewish emigrants from Nazi Germany to the United Kingdom